is a high school in the city of Aomori, Aomori Prefecture, Japan.

Originally a junior high school named , the school was established on September 11, 1900.

Aomori Prefectural First Junior High School in Hirosaki and Aomori Prefectural Second Junior High School in Hachinohe were later renamed Aomori Prefectural Hirosaki High School and Aomori Prefectural Hachinohe High School respectively. Aomori Prefectural Third Junior High School in the city of Aomori was also renamed Aomori Prefectural Aomori High School.

The school later moved to the site of the former military camp where the 2nd Battalion, 5th Infantry Regiment involved in the Hakkōda Mountains incident was based. In the 1902 accident, 199 out of 210 soldiers on winter training exercises perished.

In 2000, one of the school's chairmen embezzled 34 million yen from the school's 100th anniversary funds.

Notable alumni
Osamu Dazai, writer
Tomohiro Katō, spree killer
Keizo Miura, skier and mountain photographer
Kyōichi Sawada, photographer
Shūji Terayama, writer

References

External links
  
  

High schools in Aomori Prefecture
Education in Aomori Prefecture
Educational institutions established in 1900
1900 establishments in Japan
Aomori (city)